A constitutional referendum was held in Tajikistan on 22 June 2003. The changes included removing Article 65, which limited the President to a single term of office. They were approved by 94% of voters, with a turnout of 96%.

Results

References

2003
2003 referendums
2003 in Tajikistan
Constitutional referendums